The 24th SunBank 24 at Daytona was a 24-hour endurance sports car race held on February 1–2, 1986 at the Daytona International Speedway road course. The race served as the opening round of the 1986 IMSA GT Championship.

Victory overall and in the GTP class went to the No. 14 Holbert Racing Porsche 962 driven by Al Holbert, Derek Bell, and Al Unser Jr. Victory in the GTO Class went to the No. 64 Raintree Corporation Ford Mustang driven by Lee Mueller, Maurice Hassey, and Lanny Hester. Victory in the Lights class went to the No. 13 Outlaw Racing Argo JM19 driven by Frank Rubino, Ray Mummery, and John Schneider. Victory in the GTU class went to the No. 71 Team Highball Mazda RX-7 driven by Amos Johnson, Dennis Shaw, and Jack Dunham.

Race results
Class winners in bold.

References

24 Hours of Daytona
1986 in sports in Florida
1986 in American motorsport